Dina Anatolyevna Kochetkova (born 27 July 1977 in Moscow, Russian SFSR) is a Russian gymnast who competed at the 1996 Olympics. Stylistically, she was considered by many to be the "last of the Soviets," performing difficult skills with elegant, clean technique. An element she pioneered, a full-twisting back handspring on beam, remains in the Code of Points as "the Kochetkova".

Career 
Kochetkova was a member of the Soviet national team from the early 1990s. She won four medals at the 1991 Junior European Championships, placing second on the floor exercise and third in the all-around, vault and balance beam. She continued to succeed in minor international meets; however, she would not come to prominence as a key member of the Russian team for several more years.

1994 was Kochetkova's breakthrough year. She won the Russian National Championships, the Goodwill Games all-around, and three individual medals at the World Gymnastics Championships in Brisbane: bronze in the all-around, behind Shannon Miller and Lavinia Miloșovici; gold on the floor exercise and another bronze on the uneven bars. Many experts and fans felt she was robbed of the 1994 World AA title due to a lack of reputation.  Her bronze on uneven bars was also controversial with most believing she should have at least won silver above her teammate Khorkina, who the Russian federation was already favoring.  Her rise escalated when she ended the two-year winning streak of Shannon Miller in AA competition by defeating her for the AA title at the 1994 Goodwill Games in Saint Petersbourgh. Kochetkova won three more medals (silver AA and team; bronze FX) at the European Championships and shared in the team bronze medal at the World Team Championships in Dortmund. However, by the Team World Championships she was suddenly finding herself outshone by rising teammate Svetlana Khorkina. Khorkina was even placed after her in the lineup on every event in Team Finals, due to favoritism and bias by controversial Russian head coach Leonid Arkaev.

At the 1995 World Championships, Kochetkova and the Russian team finished off the podium in the team competition; while Kochetkova qualified for the all-around and two event finals, subpar performances and a low vault score kept her out of medal contention. At the 1996 World Championships she rallied with a high balance beam score of 9.887 to win the event; and at the 1996 Europeans she earned a bronze on floor.

Kochetkova was a member of the Russian team for the 1996 Olympics in Atlanta, and was considered a viable medal contender on several events, including for the prestigious All Around event. Prior to the competition, the Russian team were considered the dark horse contender for a Team medal behind the defending two-time World Champion Romanians, fast rising Chinese, and home country Americans. After a strong showing in the compulsory exercise, the Russians had a narrow lead at the halfway stage and were clearly delighted as they left the arena. Only the Americans stayed within striking distance going into the crucial Optionals. However while the team stars were generally solid, errors from several of the lower rank Russian gymnasts, combined with nerves from the high pressure event and the noise from the mostly-American crowd, dropped them to 2nd place in the finals. Kochetkova, as one of the most experienced team members, showed strong performances and seemed one of the least affected by the high octane atmosphere, but it was not enough to rescue her team from silver.

Kochetkova qualified in third place to the all-around competition.  Overlooked as a dark horse contender by most of the media though, due to generally being regarded as only the 3rd Russian in hype and Russian coaching favoritism to both Roza Galieva and Svetlana Khorkina, she surprised many by being tied for the lead with Chinese star Mo Huilan after three rotations. However, she was to end on vault, by far her weakest apparatus. A decision to perform a difficult 1 twisting Yurchenko vault in the final rotation proved to be unwise; Kochetkova could not perform the skill as cleanly as her simpler vaults. Her low vault score dropped her to sixth place for the individual competition—the highest of the Russians, but still shy of a medal. Had she managed anything above a 9.681 average (easily attainable for her with her 9.9 valued vault) she would have won the AA silver behind Lilia Podkopayeva of Ukraine.  And while she placed into three separate Event Finals, she had no better fortune there, finishing fourth on the balance beam and fifth on uneven parallel bars and floor exercise, all three of which she was considered a potential medalist on. Had she duplicated her beam performance from any of the earlier rounds she would have managed at least the silver medal, as her previous lowest optional beam score was a 9.825.

Kochetkova was generally the quiet contender of the top gymnasts of the mid 90s. She was overshadowed even amongst the top Russian gymnasts as far as media attention and hype by Svetlana Khorkina, Roza Galieva, and even at times Elena Grosheva and Oksana Fabrichnova, although her individual achievements at that time were comparable to Khorkina, and far beyond any of the others. The Olympics were her last major competition.

Later life 
Kochetkova underwent knee surgery in 1997 after her retirement. She lives in Moscow with her husband, working as a personal trainer.

Competitive history

Eponymous skill
Kochetkova has one eponymous skill listed in the Code of Points.

See also 
 List of Olympic female artistic gymnasts for Russia

References

External links

Full list of competitive results
 "I did not play with dolls in childhood" Interview from Sovetskiy Sport, March 1998
Spotlight on Dina Kochetkova

1977 births
Living people
Soviet female artistic gymnasts
Russian female artistic gymnasts
Olympic silver medalists for Russia
Olympic gymnasts of Russia
Gymnasts at the 1996 Summer Olympics
World champion gymnasts
Medalists at the World Artistic Gymnastics Championships
Originators of elements in artistic gymnastics
Gymnasts from Moscow
Olympic medalists in gymnastics
Medalists at the 1996 Summer Olympics
Competitors at the 1994 Goodwill Games
Goodwill Games medalists in gymnastics